John Prentis (c. 1726 – c. 1775) eldest son of William Prentis and Mary (Brooke) Prentis of Williamsburg, Virginia. His father owned and operated a successful ordinary store which he inherited upon his father's death in 1765.  During his life he served the Williamsburg community in several capacities including: Justice of the Peace, Sheriff of York County, judge of the York County Court, vestryman of Bruton Parish Church, colonel in the Williamsburg militia and as mayor of Williamsburg, Virginia from 1759 to 1760.

References

External link 
 City of Williamsburg, Virginia, History Past Mayors and Governors

Year of birth uncertain

Year of death uncertain
1720s births
1770s deaths
Mayors of Williamsburg, Virginia